The Dewoitine D.28 was a French high-wing monoplane airliner built in the early 1930s, with a single nose-mounted engine.

Specifications

References

D.28
1930s French airliners
High-wing aircraft
Aircraft first flown in 1931
Single-engined tractor aircraft